Omer Hanin (born 14 May 1998) is an Israeli professional footballer who plays as a goalkeeper for German club FSV Frankfurt.

Early life 
Hanin was born in Rishon LeZion, Israel, to a family of Sephardic Jewish descent.

He also hold a Portuguese passport, which eases the move to certain European football legaues.

Club career
Hanin made his professional debut for Hapoel Hadera in the Israeli Premier League on 5 December 2018, coming on as a substitute in the 55th minute for Austin Ejide against Hapoel Ra'anana, which finished as a 0–0 home draw.

On 23 June 2022, Hanin signed with FSV Frankfurt.

International career 
Hanin has been a youth international for both the Israel U-18 and the Israel-U19 since 2016.

Hanin has also been called-up for the Israel U-21 in 2018, ahead of 2019 UEFA U-21 Euros qualifiers matches, as well ahead of the 2021 UEFA U-21 Euros qualifiers match against Kazakhstan U-21 which ended in a 1–2 away win for his native Israel U-21.

References

External links
 
 
 
 
 

1998 births
Living people
Israeli footballers
Association football goalkeepers
Israel youth international footballers
Hapoel Rishon LeZion F.C. players
Hapoel Petah Tikva F.C. players
Hapoel Hadera F.C. players
1. FSV Mainz 05 II players
1. FSV Mainz 05 players
FSV Frankfurt players
Israeli Premier League players
Liga Leumit players
Regionalliga players
Footballers from Rishon LeZion
Israeli expatriate footballers
Israeli expatriate sportspeople in Germany
Expatriate footballers in Germany
Israeli Sephardi Jews
Jewish footballers